Jack Huggard (25 August 1901 – 18 August 1972) was an Australian rules footballer who played with Richmond in the Victorian Football League (VFL). His son, Jackie, played VFL football for Essendon and North Melbourne.

Huggard was captain-coach of the Benalla Football Club in the Ovens and Murray Football League in 1928 and then returned to Melbourne, playing with Camberwell in the Victorian Football Association (VFA) in 1929.

Notes

External links 

Jack Huggard's playing statistics from The VFA Project

1901 births
1972 deaths
Australian rules footballers from Victoria (Australia)
Richmond Football Club players
Cobram Football Club players
Camberwell Football Club players